Derek Young (born 27 May 1980) is a Scottish ex-professional association football midfielder. Young started his career alongside his brother Darren at Aberdeen before leaving with him in 2003 to join Dunfermline Athletic. Spells at St Johnstone and Partick Thistle followed before returning to Aberdeen for another four years. He spent a short spell in Iceland with Grindavík before returning to Scotland with Morton in 2011. In summer 2012 he joined Queen of the South with whom he won a league and cup double. He joined Forfar Athletic in 2014 before ending his playing career with a season at Formartine United.

Career
Young grew up in Whitlawburn, Cambuslang and attended Cathkin High School. He started his career with Aberdeen where without winning any trophies, he played in numerous UEFA Cup games including a tie against Hertha Berlin. He also represented Scotland under 21s.

He then joined Dunfermline Athletic where he was part of the club's best times since the days of George Farm in the late 1960s. Young played in a Scottish Cup Final defeat against Celtic in 2004(alongside his brother Darren), and in a loss to the same opponents in the 2006 Scottish League Cup Final. He was then briefly at St Johnstone before spending most of the 2006–07 season playing for Partick Thistle.

Young rejoined Aberdeen in July 2007. Like his first spell there, he again tasted UEFA competition against the likes of Atlético Madrid. In April 2011, he was told by Aberdeen manager Craig Brown that his contract would not be renewed for the following season. In July 2011, he signed for Icelandic club Grindavík.

After leaving Grindavik, Young was offered a contract until the end of 2011 by Greenock Morton, but was unable to play against Livingston due to a suspension that only was brought to light when Morton received international clearance from the Icelandic FA. His signing was confirmed in November along with the loan signing of Dominic Cervi. In January 2012, Young was offered a contract extension by Allan Moore until the end of the season; the contract offer was accepted and signed on 6 January. Young was released by Morton at the end of the 2011–12 season due to difficulties travelling over from Aberdeen for training.

Young signed for Queen of the South during the 2012 summer transfer window. Young scored for Queen of the South in their 4–3 penalty shootout win against Rangers at Ibrox. and did the same when Queens won the 2013 Scottish Challenge Cup Final that season against Partick. Having already won the 2012–13 Scottish Second Division title by a large margin, this gave Young and his teammates a league and cup double.

Young moved to Forfar Athletic in June 2014, spending two season with the Station Park club before signing for Highland League club Formartine United in July 2016.

Honours
Queen of the South
 Scottish Division Two Champions: 2012–13
 Scottish Challenge Cup Winners: 2012–13

References

External links

Scotland stats at Fitbastats
Profile and stats at AFC Heritage Trust

Living people
1980 births
Footballers from Glasgow
Sportspeople from Cambuslang
People educated at Cathkin High School
Scottish footballers
Association football midfielders
Scottish Premier League players
Scottish Football League players
Aberdeen F.C. players
Dunfermline Athletic F.C. players
Partick Thistle F.C. players
St Johnstone F.C. players
Grindavík men's football players
Greenock Morton F.C. players
Queen of the South F.C. players
Forfar Athletic F.C. players
Formartine United F.C. players
Scotland under-21 international footballers
Scottish expatriate sportspeople in Iceland
Scottish expatriate footballers
Expatriate footballers in Iceland
Scottish Professional Football League players
Highland Football League players
Footballers from South Lanarkshire